Justice is a British drama television series that originally aired on ITV in 39 hour-long episodes between 8 August 1971 and 16 October 1974. Margaret Lockwood stars as Harriet Peterson, a female barrister in the North of England. It was made by Yorkshire Television and was based loosely on Justice Is a Woman, an episode of ITV Playhouse broadcast in 1969 in which Lockwood had played a barrister. The theme music is Crown Imperial by William Walton.

The series was broadcast by the UK TV channel Talking Pictures TV in 2021/22.

Main cast
 Margaret Lockwood – Harriet Peterson 
 John Stone – Doctor Ian Moody 
 John Bryans – Arthur Bollington (series 1, episode 2) and William Corletti (series 2 and 3)
 Philip Stone – Sir John Gallagher  
 Anthony Valentine – Robert Miller (series 1, episode 11) and James Eliot (series 3)
 Rose Collins – Rosie

DVD release
The complete series is available on DVD in the UK in three series sets.

References

External links
 

1970s British drama television series
1970s British crime television series
1970s British legal television series
1971 British television series debuts
ITV television dramas
Television series by ITV Studios
Television series by Yorkshire Television
English-language television shows